The Minister of the Interior of Colombia It is in charge of the general coordination of citizen participation policies, decentralization, territorial organization, political and legislative affairs, public order (together with the Ministry of National Defense), electoral processes, ethnic minorities, displaced population, religious communities, LGBTIQ population, rights humans, among other things. The Minister of the Interior is appointed by the President of the Republic, and occupies the first place in the order of ministerial precedence and of the administrative departments.

Duties and responsibilities 
The functions of the Minister of the Interior, in addition to those indicated by the Political Constitution, are the following:
Exercise, under his own responsibility, the functions that the President of the Republic delegates to him or the Law confers on him and monitor compliance with those that by legal mandate have been granted to dependencies of the Ministry, as well as those that have been delegated to officials.
Participate in the orientation, coordination and control of the attached and linked entities belonging to the administrative sector of the Interior.
Direct and guide the planning function of the administrative sector of the Interior.
Review and approve the draft investment and operating budgets and the prospectus for the use of public credit resources contemplated for the administrative sector of the Interior.
Monitor the course of execution of the budget corresponding to the Ministry.
Sign on behalf of the Nation and in accordance with the Public Procurement Statute and the Organic Budget Law, the contracts related to matters pertaining to the Ministry.
Direct the functions of personnel administration in accordance with the regulations on the matter.
Act as the immediate superior of the legal representatives of the other affiliated or related entities, without prejudice to the nominating function.
Formulate sectoral policies, general plans, programs and projects of the Administrative Sector of the Interior, under the direction of the President of the Republic.
Represent, in matters of its competence, the National Government in the execution of international treaties and conventions, in accordance with the legal regulations on the matter.
Organize and regulate functional management areas or work groups for the adequate attention of matters pertaining to the dependencies.
Create, conform and assign functions to the advisory and coordination bodies, necessary for the fulfillment of the Ministry's mission, through an administrative act, within the framework of its competence.
Coordinate the activity of the Ministry, in relation to its mission and objectives, with the Public Entities of the national order and decentralized territorially and by services, the Congress of the Republic, the Judicial Branch, the National Registry of Civil Status and the control organisms .
Give instructions to the National Police for the conservation and restoration of internal public order in those matters whose direction does not correspond to the Minister of National Defense.
Plan, coordinate, formulate policies and draw guidelines that guide the course of the country's legal system and the justice system.
Prepare and promote bills and legislative acts before the Congress of the Republic in matters related to the objectives, mission and functions of the Ministry, and coordinate the action of the National Government before the Congress of the Republic, with the assistance of the other ministries. .
Promote within the respective instances, and with the collaboration of the competent state entities, international cooperation in matters of its competence.
Advance the special programs that are required in the development of the functions that are determined.
Coordinate and direct the action of the State leading to the development of the 'Program for the Reincorporation into Civil Life of Persons and Groups in Arms', through which persons and armed and organized groups outside the law who demobilize will be assisted and voluntarily lay down their arms, in coordination with the Ministry of National Defense.

See also
List of ministers of the interior of Colombia

References 

Government ministries of Colombia
Interior ministers